The 58th Ariel Awards ceremony, organized by the Mexican Academy of Film Arts and Sciences (AMACC) took take place on May 28, 2016, at the National Auditorium in Mexico City. During the ceremony, AMACC presented the Ariel Award in 26 categories honoring films released in 2015. The ceremony, was televised in Mexico by Canal Once.

Las Elegidas, and Gloria each won five awards, with the former earning the Best Picture honor. Other winners included Mexican Gangster: La Leyenda del Charro Misterioso with four; 600 Millas, and El Hombre Que Vio Demasiado with two; and Ausencias, El Abrazo de la Serpiente, El Jeremías, Hilda, La Increíble Historia del Niño de Piedra, Un Monstruo de Mil Cabezas, Trémulo, and Zimbo with one.

Winners and nominees
The nominees for the 58th Ariel Awards were announced on April 13, 2016 at the Cineteca Nacional in Mexico City, by Dolores Heredia, president of the Academy, and actors Adriana Paz and Juan Manuel Bernal, winners for Best Actress and Best Actor, respectively, at the 57th Ariel Awards. La Delgada Línea Amarilla and Gloria received the most nominations with fourteen; 600 Millas and Las Elegidas came in second with thirteen apiece. The Golden Ariel was awarded to actress Rosita Quintana and film director Paul Leduc. The ceremony was held at the National Auditorium in Mexico City for the first time, instead of its traditional venue, Palacio de Bellas Artes, in order to increase the capacity to 2,300 seats, according to Heredia.

Awards
Winners are listed first and highlighted with boldface.

Golden Ariel
Rosita Quintana
Paul Leduc

Multiple nominations and awards

The following twelve films received multiple nominations:

Films that received multiple awards:

Ceremony information
The Mexican Academy of Film Arts and Sciences (AMACC) registered 152 films to compete for the Ariel Awards of 2016 in 26 categories, an increase of 11% from 2015. The films comprised were 71 feature films (including twelve documentaries and nine animated films) and 13 films for the Best Iberoamerican Feature Film. For the Best Picture award, 41 films were considered, as they meet the requirement of having commercial exhibition in cinemas in Mexico or been exhibited at international film festivals in 2015. The AMACC created a committee of 189 people, who were active members and previous Ariel Award nominees and winners to vote for the 2015 nominees. To promote the award ceremony, a photo exhibition showing the actresses awarded the Ariel for Best Lead Actress was inaugurated on May 2, 2016 at the gates of the Bosque de Chapultepec. An official tour titled "Rumbo al Ariel" showed the nominated films on movie theaters in Mexico City, including the Cineteca Nacional, Cinemanía Loreto and Cine Tonalá, among others. Three nominated films have had a successful runs on international film festivals. Las Elegidas was included in the selection for the Un Certain Regard at the 68th Cannes Film Festival. 600 Millas was awarded the Best First Feature Award at the 65th Berlin International Film Festival and was selected to represent Mexico for the 88th Academy Awards; the box office performance in the country was "discreet", according to newspaper El País with 92,000 attendees. La Delgada Línea Amarilla was named Best Iberoamerican Film and the Bronze Zenith Award for The Best First Fiction Feature Film at the Montreal World Film Festival. Meanwhile, Gloria, a biopic about Mexican singer-songwriter Gloria Trevi, was premiered in 2014, but formalities presented by the Mexican Academy prevented it to be postulated that year.

Box office performance of nominees
At the time of the nominations announcement on April 13, the highest earner among the nominated films was Un Gallo con Muchos Huevos with MXN$167.8 million in domestic box office receipts, and also was the highest-grossing film of 2015 in Mexico. Only one Best Picture nominee ranked at the top ten, Gloria, at number five with MXN$34.9 million. At number seven, Elvira, te daría mi vida pero la estoy usando, with earnings of MXN$23.0 million, was nominated for Best Supporting Actress. As for the rest of the Best Picture nominated films, Las Elegidas had its commercial release in theaters in Mexico on April 22 and was made available for streaming via Netflix on May 8. 600 Millas earned MXN$4.4 million in Mexico.

References

Ariel Awards ceremonies
2016 film awards
2016 in Mexican cinema